Danganronpa 3: The End of Hope's Peak High School is a two-part anime television series produced by Lerche. The series is part of Spike Chunsoft's Danganronpa franchise and serves as a conclusion to the "Hope's Peak Academy" storyline featured in the video games Danganronpa: Trigger Happy Havoc, Danganronpa 2: Goodbye Despair, and Danganronpa Another Episode: Ultra Despair Girls. The series is divided into two parts that aired simultaneously: Future Arc, which aired in Japan between July 11, 2016, and September 26, 2016, and Despair Arc, which aired between July 14, 2016, and September 22, 2016, followed by a final episode, Hope Arc, which aired on September 29, 2016. Future Arc focuses on Makoto Naegi and his friends and their involvement in a killing game with the Future Foundation, and Despair Arc, focused on Hajime Hinata, a student and his involvement in experiments on humans. Both story arcs aired between July and September 2016, followed by a third, Hope Arc, finale that aired on September 29, 2016, concluding both arcs. An original video animation titled Super Danganronpa 2.5, set between Danganronpa 2 and Future Arc, was released with limited editions of Danganronpa V3: Killing Harmony on January 12, 2017.

For Future Arc, the opening theme is "Dead or Lie" by Maon Kurosaki and Trustrick, while the ending theme is "Recall the End" by Trustrick. The ending theme for Hope Arc is "ever free" by hide with Spread Beaver. The series are licensed in North America by Funimation, who simulcast them in North America, the United Kingdom, and Ireland as they aired and streamed English dubs from August 10, 2016.

Both story arcs were released in a total of six DVDs and Blu-ray volumes released between September 28, 2016, and February 22, 2017. Four Blu-ray boxes were also released containing additional material. Another Blu-ray box containing the entire series was released on November 25, 2018, as well as one in celebration of the series' 10th anniversary. 

Fumination released the English series in two Blu-ray sets on October 3, 2017 and re-released them as part of their essentials line on August 26, 2019, also in two sets. In Australia, Madman Entertainment licensed the series and released the series' home media release of the series on December 6, 2017. Animax Asia streamed the series in Southeast Asia.

Episode list

Future Arc

Despair Arc

Hope Arc

Original video animation

DVDs and Blu-ray

Original release

Blu-ray boxes

English release
First release

Essentials re-release

References

External links
  

Danganronpa
Danganronpa 3: The End of Hope's Peak High School